Amazunculus is a genus of flies in the family Pipunculidae.

Species
Amazunculus besti Rafael, 1986
Amazunculus claripennis Rafael & Rosa, 1992
Amazunculus cordigaster Galinkin & Rafael, 2008
Amazunculus deargentatus Galinkin & Rafael, 2008
Amazunculus duckei Galinkin & Rafael, 2008
Amazunculus platypodus (Hardy, 1950)

References

Pipunculidae
Brachycera genera
Diptera of South America